The Polish People's Party is a Polish agrarian political party.

Polish People's Party may also refer to:

Polish People's Party "Piast" (1913–31)
Polish People's Party "Wyzwolenie", active in the interwar period
Polish People's Party (Czechoslovakia), active in the 1920s
Polska Partia Ludowa (Czechoslovakia)
Polish People's Party "Left", active in the 1920s
People's Party, union of PSL Wyzwolenie, PSL Piast and Stronnictwo Chłopskie
Polish People's Party (1945–49)
Polish People's Party "Nowe Wyzwolenie", active after World War II
United People's Party, satellite party of Polish United Workers Party in Polish People's Republic
Polish People's Party-Peasants' Agreement, active since 1991 to 1999
Polska Partia Ludowa (Lithuania), active since 2002
Polish People's Party "Piast" (founded 2006)